Auður Ava Ólafsdóttir (born 1958) is an Icelandic professor of art history, a novelist, playwright and poet. She received the Nordic Council Literature Prize for Hotel Silence in 2018 and the Médicis Foreign Award for Miss Iceland in 2019.

Early life and education
Auður Ava Ólafsdóttir was born in 1958, in Reykjavík. She studied history of art at Sorbonne, Paris, France.

Career
Auður works as an assistant professor of art history at the University of Iceland. For a time, she was the director of the university's Art Museum.

Her first novel Upphækkuð jörð (Raised Earth) was published in 1998. It set the stage for her future works in its fine dissection of the smaller things in life.

Her book Rigning í nóvember (Butterflies in November) was lauded as a "moving, layered and optimistic piece of writing". The book won the Tómas Guðmundsson Literary Award.

In 2009, she published Afleggjarinn (The Greenhouse) to mixed reviews. It was described as meticulous and finely crafted, yet lacking a tension both in its language and friction in its emotion. It was also described as a sweetly comic and wry observation of sex, manhood, death and parenthood.

Personal life
Auður has revealed that her temporary residence in Catholic countries and her deep interest in their art and music led her to convert to Roman Catholicism.

Works

Novels
 Upphækkuð jörð (Raised Earth), 1998
 Rigning í nóvember, 2004, in English as Butterflies in November, in German as Ein Schmetterling in November
 Afleggjarinn, 2007, in English as The Greenhouse, also translated into French, Spanish, Dutch and Italian
 Undantekningin (The Exception), 2012
 Ör (Scar), 2016, in English as Hotel Silence, also translated into Portuguese, Swedish (Ärr) and Estonian as Arm.
 Ungfrú Ísland, 2018, in English as Miss Iceland, also translated into French
 Dýralíf, 2020, in English as Animal Life.

Poetry
 Sálmurinn um glimmer (The Psalm of Glimmer), 2010

Theatre
 Swans mate for life (National Theatre of Iceland, 2014)

Awards
 2018 - Bókmenntaverðlaun Norðurlandaráðs: Ör
 2016 - Íslensku bókmenntaverðlaunin: Ör
 2011 - Prix des libraires du Québec: Rosa Candida (Afleggjarinn í franskri þýðingu Catherine Eyjólfsson). Í flokknum þýðingar (Roman hors Québec)
 2010 - Prix de Page (Frakkland): Rosa Candida
 2008 - Menningarverðlaun DV í bókmenntum: Afleggjarinn
 2008 - Fjöruverðlaunin, bókmenntaverðlaun kvenna: Afleggjarinn
 2004 - Bókmenntaverðlaun Tómasar Guðmundssonar: Rigning í nóvember

See also 

 List of Icelandic writers

References

External links

  Info
  literature.is

1958 births
Living people
Audur Ava Olafsdottir
Icelandic novelists
Icelandic poets
Audur Ava Olafsdottir
Audur Ava Olafsdottir
Prix Médicis étranger winners
Converts to Roman Catholicism from Lutheranism